Valtiendas is a municipality located in the province of Segovia, Castile and León, Spain. According to the 2004 census (INE), the municipality has a population of 161 inhabitants.

It is formed by three towns: Valtiendas, Pecharromán and Caserío de San José.

References 

Municipalities in the Province of Segovia